Andrew Mason (born 16 March 1979) was an English cricketer. He was a right-handed batsman and a right-arm off-break bowler who played for Herefordshire. He was born in Worcester.

Mason, who appeared in the Minor Counties Championship and the ECB 38-County Cup between 1999 and 2002, made a single List A appearance for the team, in the C&G Trophy competition in September 2001. He scored a single run.

External links
Andrew Mason at Cricket Archive 

1979 births
Living people
English cricketers
Herefordshire cricketers